Into the Wild is an American documentary series written and directed by Jared Leto. The series tells the story behind the concert tour of the same name by American rock band Thirty Seconds to Mars, which propelled the group into arenas around the world and was certified by the Guinness World Records as the longest running tour in the history of rock music. The series is produced by Leto and Emma Ludbrook through the production company Sisyphus Corporation. Into the Wild premiered internationally on November 30, 2014, on the online platform VyRT.

Background
Thirty Seconds to Mars released their third studio album This Is War on December 8, 2009. After a promotional tour in winter of that year, the band embarked on their Into the Wild Tour in February 2010 in support of the album. The tour reached the Americas, Europe, Africa, Asia and Australasia over a two-year period. Along with playing arenas and amphitheatres, the tour headlined at several festivals in Europe and Australia. On October 16, 2011, it was announced that the band would enter the Guinness World Records for most live shows during a single album cycle, with 300 shows. The 300th show, called Tribus Centum Numerarae, took place on December 7, 2011 at the Hammerstein Ballroom in New York City and was followed by a special series of shows which marked the end of the Into the Wild Tour.

A concert film recorded during the tour was first announced through several teasers released in 2012. Jared Leto, however, after noticing the amount of live footage recorded, decided to release a documentary series which was officially announced on November 3, 2014. In an interview with Rolling Stone, Leto stated, "You travel the world, you get on stages all over the planet, you have all kinds of once-in-a-lifetime experiences, and what's special is to document that and then share it. This is us in Lebanon and Russia and Israel and Brazil and South Africa – we're sharing some of the most intimate moments of our lives, and also some of the biggest."

Overview
The series is set to have "anywhere from 16 to 20-something" episodes where Thirty Seconds to Mars travel the world in support of their third album This Is War.

Leto described the series as an "unofficial sequel" to Artifact, a documentary film about the legal dispute between Thirty Seconds to Mars and record label EMI. He explained, "it's what happens when Artifact left off. Literally. The last shot of the film is the first shot of the series." The series is directed by Jared Leto under his longtime pseudonym Bartholomew Cubbins. A trailer for the series premiered in November 2014, featuring a British narrator and assorted live scenes, paired with some interviews and some of the band's songs, including "Closer to the Edge".

Episodes

References

External links
 
 

2010s American documentary television series
2014 American television series debuts
Documentary television series about music
English-language television shows
Thirty Seconds to Mars
Works by Jared Leto